Luís de la Fuente or Luís de la Fuentes was a Roman Catholic prelate who served as Bishop of Nicaragua (1564–1566).

Biography
On 28 Apr 1564, Luís de la Fuente was appointed during the papacy of Pope Pius IV as Bishop of Nicaragua.
While bishop, he presided over the merger of Costa Rica and Nicaragua into a single ecclesiastical jurisdiction. On 6 Jul 1565, he was consecrated bishop. He served as Bishop of Nicaragua until his death in Dec 1566.

References

External links and additional sources
 (for Chronology of Bishops) 
 (for Chronology of Bishops) 

16th-century Roman Catholic bishops in Nicaragua
Bishops appointed by Pope Pius IV
1566 deaths
Roman Catholic bishops of León in Nicaragua